Navan in Iran may refer to:
 Navan, Gilan (ناوان - Nāvān)